The untitled Five Nights at Freddy's film is an upcoming American supernatural horror film directed by  Emma Tammi, from a screenplay she co-wrote with Scott Cawthon and Seth Cuddeback, based on the video game franchise of the same name created and developed by Cawthon. It stars Josh Hutcherson, Matthew Lillard, Mary Stuart Masterson, and Piper Rubio, and follows a troubled security guard as he starts a night-time job at a family entertainment center where he discovers its four animatronic mascots move and kill anyone that is still there after midnight.

The film was first announced in April 2015 with the involvement of Warner Bros. Pictures, and in July 2015, Gil Kenan made a deal to direct and co-write it. After several delays to begin production, Warner Bros. eventually put the project into turnaround and Kenan was no longer involved. In March 2017, it was announced that Blumhouse Productions would produce the film. Chris Columbus was set to write and direct it in February 2018. Later, Columbus left the project, with Tammi replacing him as director and co-writer in October 2022. Principal photography began in February 2023 in New Orleans and is expected to end on April 6.

The film is scheduled to be theatrically released in the United States by Universal Pictures.

Cast 
 Josh Hutcherson as Mike Schmidt
 Matthew Lillard as William Afton
 Mary Stuart Masterson as an unnamed villain
 Piper Rubio as Abby Schmidt

Production

Development

Warner Bros. Pictures (2015–2017)
Warner Bros. Pictures announced in April 2015 that it had acquired the film rights to the video game series Five Nights at Freddy's. Roy Lee, David Katzenberg, and Seth Grahame-Smith were set to produce the adaptation. Grahame-Smith stated that they would collaborate with series creator Scott Cawthon "to make an insane, terrifying and weirdly adorable movie". In July 2015, Gil Kenan signed to direct the adaptation and co-write it with Tyler Burton Smith.

In January 2017, Cawthon stated that partially due to "problems within the movie industry as a whole", the film "was met with several delays and roadblocks" and it was "back at square one", but he promised, In March 2017, Cawthon posted on Twitter a picture at Blumhouse Productions, announcing the film had a new production company. In May 2017, producer Jason Blum said he was excited and working closely with Cawthon on the adaptation. In June 2017, Kenan said he was no longer directing the film after Warner Bros. Pictures' turnaround.

Blumhouse Productions (2017–present) 

In February 2018, it was announced that Chris Columbus would direct and write the film, besides producing it alongside Blum and Cawthon.

In August 2018, Cawthon announced that the first draft of the film's script, which he wrote with co-author of the Five Nights at Freddy's novel trilogy Kira Breed-Wrisley, was completed, and would involve the events of the first game in the series. In the same month, Blum wrote on Twitter that the film was aiming for a 2020 release. In November, Cawthon announced that his script for the film, despite being liked by Columbus and Blum, had been scrapped by him, as he "had a different idea for [the story], one that I liked better". This would contribute to a further delay to the film, which Cawthon took full responsibility. In June 2020, during an interview with Fandom, producer Jason Blum, when asked about the progress of the film, stated: 

In September 2021, it was revealed by Blum that Columbus was no longer involved with the project, but it was still in active development. In August 2022, Blum revealed Jim Henson's Creature Shop would be working on the animatronics for the film. In October of the same year, Emma Tammi was announced to direct the film in addition to co-writing alongside Cawthon and Seth Cuddeback.

Casting 
In December 2022, Josh Hutcherson and Matthew Lillard joined the cast as undisclosed roles. Popular YouTuber Dawko later revealed during a livestream that Hutcherson would portray security guard Mike Schmidt and Lillard would portray the main villain William Afton. He also revealed that Mary Stuart Masterson and Piper Rubio joined the cast as an undisclosed female villain and Schmidt's younger sister Abby, respectively.

Filming 
Principal photography was initially set to begin in spring 2021. However, due to script issues, filming was delayed. Filming began in New Orleans on February 1, 2023, under the working title Bad Cupcake, and is expected to be completed on April 6. Lillard began filming his scenes in mid February.

Future 
In August 2018, Cawthon said that if the first film (which, at the time, was planned to pick up the story from the first game) were to be successful, there could be a second and third film, following the events of the second and third games, respectively. In January 2023, in an interview on the podcast WeeklyMTG, Lillard revealed he signed a three-picture deal with Blumhouse and Universal Pictures.

References

External links 
 

Upcoming films
2020s action horror films
American supernatural horror films
American horror thriller films
American robot films
Universal Pictures films
Blumhouse Productions films
Films produced by Jason Blum
Live-action films based on video games
English-language films
Five Nights at Freddy's